Bernard Francis McCarthy (21 August 1943 – 16 February 2019) was an Australian rules footballer who played with North Melbourne in the Victorian Football League (VFL).

McCarthy was the eldest of three brothers from Yea who played in the VFL. The youngest, Shane, played at Geelong and the other, Gavan McCarthy, made two appearances for North Melbourne, one of them with Bernie in round five of the 1965 VFL season. A nephew, Matthew, was also a Geelong footballer and another, John, played at Collingwood and Port Adelaide.

A centre half-forward, McCarthy partnered John Dugdale as North Melbourne's key forwards throughout the 1960s.

He finished the 1971 season at Victorian Football Association (VFA) club Preston and was one of the club's best players in the Grand Final loss to Dandenong that year.

His career then continued in the Bendigo Football League, where he captain-coached South Bendigo. He won the Michelsen Medal in 1973 and led his side to a premiership in 1974.

McCarthy died on 16 February 2019, aged 75.

References

External links
Bernie Francis's playing statistics from The VFA Project

1943 births
2019 deaths
Australian rules footballers from Victoria (Australia)
North Melbourne Football Club players
Preston Football Club (VFA) players
South Bendigo Football Club players
Australian rules football coaches